Cela may refer to:

People 
 Cela (surname), a Spanish-Galician surname
 Çela, an Albanian surname
 Ćela, nickname of Stevan Nedić (1875–1923), Serbian Chetnik commander in Old Serbia and Macedonia

Placenames and jurisdictions

Spain 
 Balsa de Cela, a natural thermal spring in Lúcar, Almería
 Cela, Cambre, a parish in A Coruña
 Cela, León, a locality in León
 Cela, O Corgo, a parish in Lugo
 Cela, Outeiro de Rei, a parish in Lugo

Portugal 
 Cela, Alcobaça, a parish in the Leiria district
 Cela, Chaves, a parish in the municipality of Chaves

Other 
 Cela, Angola, a municipality in the Cuanza-Sul province
 Cella Dati, known as Céla in the Cremunés dialect, a municipality in Cremona, Italy
 Coela, also known as Cela, a Roman city and diocese, now a Latin Catholic titular see
 Ekinözü, known as Cela in Kurdish, a town and district in Turkey

Biology 
 CELA1, an enzyme that in humans is encoded by the CELA1 gene
 CELA2A, an enzyme that in humans is encoded by the CELA2A gene
 CELA2B, an enzyme that in humans is encoded by the CELA2B gene
 CELA3A, an enzyme that in humans is encoded by the CELA3A gene
 CELA3B, an enzyme that in humans is encoded by the CELA3B gene

Other uses 
 cela, a French demonstrative pronoun
 Cela Sculptoris, commonly known as Caelum, a faint constellation in the southern sky
 Tropical Cyclone Cela, a tropical cyclone which moved across Madagascar in December 2003; see 2003–04 South-West Indian Ocean cyclone season
 Canadian Environmental Law Association, non-profit, public interest organization
 Centro de Estudios Latinoamericanos,  National Autonomous University of Mexico
 A character in the film The Big Brass Ring
 A character in the video game Unison: Rebels of Rhythm & Dance

See also 
 Isabel Celaá (born 1949), Spanish politician
 Cella (disambiguation)
 Cala (disambiguation)
 Sela (disambiguation)